U.S. Route 14 (abbreviated U.S. 14 or US 14), an east–west route, is one of the original United States highways of 1926. It currently has a length of 1,398 miles (2,250 km), but it had a peak length of 1,429 miles (2,300 km). For much of its length, it runs roughly parallel to Interstate 90.

The highway's eastern terminus is in Chicago, Illinois. Its western terminus is the east entrance of Yellowstone National Park in Wyoming, with the western terminus of U.S. Route 16 and the western terminus of the eastern segment of U.S. Route 20.

Route description

Wyoming 

U.S. 14 begins at the east entrance to Yellowstone National Park, along with U.S. 16 and the eastern segment of U.S. 20. It travels through the Shoshone National Forest to Cody, where U.S. 14A splits off to the north. Both routes traverse the dry Bighorn Basin, followed by a steep ascent up the Big Horn Mountains and through the Bighorn National Forest, where they rejoin at Burgess Junction. The highway descends the eastern slope of the Bighorns between Burgess Junction and Dayton. U.S. 14 briefly follows I-90 south from Ranchester to Sheridan. The highway turns east and then south to again join I-90 near Gillette. It splits off for a short time to Carlile, then rejoins I-90 which it follows to the state line.

South Dakota 
The South Dakota section of U.S. 14, passes, east to west, through Brookings, Arlington, De Smet, Huron, Wolsey, Miller, Highmore, Pierre, Midland, Philip, and Wall before connecting to I-90. U.S. 14 follows I-90 to Rapid City, Sturgis, and Spearfish into Wyoming. U.S. 14A winds through the northern part of the scenic Black Hills taking travelers from Sturgis to Spearfish.
 
The Laura Ingalls Wilder Historic Highway incorporates U.S. 14 from De Smet, South Dakota in the west to Rochester, Minnesota in the east.

US 14 and U.S. 83 serve Pierre, South Dakota, one of only four state capitals not on the Interstate Highway System.

Minnesota 

U.S. 14 enters the state from South Dakota west of Lake Benton. It goes east through several small towns such as Balaton, Tracy, Revere, Lamberton, Sanborn and Sleepy Eye, on a two-lane road until New Ulm, where it is briefly a divided highway. From New Ulm to Mankato, the highway lies north of the Minnesota River. Shortly before coming to the Mankato/North Mankato area, U.S. 14 becomes a freeway bypass, which becomes an expressway east of Mankato. This section is part of the Laura Ingalls Wilder Historic Highway as it passes through Walnut Grove. It currently continues east south of Waseca and at Owatonna, it crosses Interstate 35 at a cloverleaf interchange. It then heads east towards Rochester, with an expressway segment beginning at Minnesota State Highway 56 and continuing east into Rochester. Once it enters Rochester, it has a concurrency with U.S. Route 52. After the concurrency, it continues through Rochester as a divided highway. After Rochester, the highway parallels Interstate 90 until Winona, where U.S. 14 gets picked up by U.S. Route 61. The two highways run concurrently the rest of the way in Minnesota, and cross the Mississippi River at La Crescent over the La Crosse West Channel Bridge.

U.S. 14 was extended to a full, limited-access freeway from approximately three miles west of Janesville to Interstate 35 at Owatonna. Most of the new route is located south of the existing alignment so as to avoid overlapping Interstate 35. The expansion was opened to traffic on August 31, 2012, creating a continuous four-lane route from North Mankato to Owatonna. The section from Waseca to Janesville has yet to be upgraded to freeway standards; it currently exists as an expressway.

The four-lane expressway was extended from North Mankato to Nicollet including a SW bypass of Nicollet and an interchange for State Highway 111 in 2016.

Owatonna to Dodge Center will be upgraded to a freeway in 2021. The new freeway is expected to be open to traffic in the fall of 2021.

Nicollet to New Ulm will be upgraded to a four-lane expressway including a bypass of Courtland. Construction will begin in 2022.

US 14 is being planned to be upgraded to a freeway between Byron and Rochester with three new interchanges planned. An interim safety project will construct two reduced conflict intersections in 2022.

The Minnesota section of U.S. 14 is defined as part of Constitutional Route 7 and Trunk Highways 121 and 122 in the Minnesota Statutes.

Wisconsin 

U.S. 14 enters the state of Wisconsin along with U.S. Route 61 across the Mississippi River into La Crosse. Running through rural southern Wisconsin, it then meets with U.S. Route 12 outside of Madison. Following the Beltline Highway around Madison, it meets U.S. Route 18 and U.S. Route 151 before turning south, passing through some southern Madison suburbs, Oregon, and Evansville before approaching Janesville. Bypassing Janesville to the north, U.S. 14 intersects U.S. Route 51, as well as Interstate 90 and Interstate 39. It then travels southeast, past Interstate 43, to the village square of Walworth. U.S. 14 then turns south and exits into Illinois at Big Foot Prairie.

Illinois 

In the state of Illinois, U.S. 14 runs southeast from north of Harvard to Chicago via Woodstock and the northwest suburbs. Southeast of Route 47, U.S. 14 has four lanes, and at times it is a high-speed divided highway. Continuing southeastward from just after the overpass above Route 31, U.S. 14 passes beneath and then closely parallels the tracks of the Union Pacific Railroad's Harvard Subdivision. Through the northwest suburbs of Chicago, this route is commonly referred to as "Northwest Highway" and is a very busy thoroughfare. East of Des Plaines, U.S. 14 becomes Dempster Street until its intersection with Waukegan Road. From here, U.S. 14 follows Waukegan Road, Caldwell Avenue, Peterson Avenue, and Ridge Avenue to its eastern end, at the corner of Broadway and U.S. 41 (Foster Avenue).

At an earlier point, U.S. 14 extended south on Lake Shore Drive onto Michigan Avenue.

History 

U.S. 14 was originally the "Black and Yellow Trail", so named as it connected Minnesota with the Black Hills and Yellowstone National Park.

In Chicago's Northwest Suburbs, it is known as Northwest Highway due to its direction as well as it paralleling the old Chicago and North Western railroad (now Union Pacific.) It was originally called the Northwest Highway from Chicago to New Ulm, Minnesota, and some street signs in New Ulm, Chicago, and towns in between still show the old designation.

From Ucross west to Sheridan, Wyoming, US 14 was initially designated U.S. Route 116 in 1926. US 116 was extended west to Cody in 1933, absorbing the Deaver-Cody US 420. The next year, US 116 became an extension of US 14. Part of this extension, including all of US 420, is now US 14A.

Major intersections
Wyoming
  at the East Entrance to Yellowstone National Park, southeast of Pahaska Tepee. The highways travel concurrently to Greybull.
  west-northwest of Greybull
  northeast of Ranchester. The highways travel concurrently to Sheridan.
  southeast of Sheridan. The highways travel concurrently to Moorcroft.
  in Gillette. The highways travel concurrently to Moorcroft.
  in Sundance
  in Sundance. The highways travel concurrently to east-southeast of Wall, South Dakota.
South Dakota
  in North Spearfish. The highways travel concurrently to Spearfish.
  in Rapid City
  in Fort Pierre. The highways travel concurrently to west-southwest of Blunt.
  north-northwest of Wolsey. The highways travel concurrently to south-southeast of Wolsey.
  in Arlington. The highways travel concurrently to south of Arlington.
  in Brookings
Minnesota
  in Lake Benton. The highways travel concurrently through the city.
  north of Garvin
  north of Sanborn
  on the North Mankato–Mankato city line
  in Owatonna. US 14/US 218 travel concurrently to southeast of Owatonna.
  in Rochester. The highways travel concurrently through the city.
  in Winona. The highways travel concurrently to Readstown, Wisconsin.
  in Dakota. The highways travel concurrently to north of La Crescent.
Wisconsin
  in La Crosse
  in Middleton. The highways travel concurrently to Madison.
  in Madison. The highways travel concurrently through the city.
  in Janesville
  in Janesville
  in Darien
Illinois
  in Des Plaines
  in Des Plaines
  in Chicago
  in Chicago

See also 
 
 Special routes of U.S. Route 14

References

External links 

 Endpoints of U.S. Highway 14
 Illinois Highway Ends: US 14
 The Unofficial South Dakota Highways Page: US-14

 
14
14
14
Transportation in Brown County, Minnesota
New Ulm, Minnesota